Montgomery County Council may be:
Montgomery County Council (Alabama)
Montgomery County Council (Kansas)
Montgomery County Council (Maryland)
Montgomery County Council (New York)
Montgomeryshire, Wales (1889-1974)